The following is a list of Sri Lankan sportspeople.

Archery
Shashikala Kumarasinghe
Dilhara Salgado

Badminton
Lucky Dharmasena
Nadeesha Gayanthi
Thilini Hendahewa
Thilini Jayasinghe
Chamika Karunaratne
Dinuka Karunaratne
Niluka Karunaratne
Oshadie Kuruppu
Inoka Rohini de Silva
Lekha Shehani
Chandrika de Silva
Kavidi Sirimannage
Niroshan Wijekoon

Basketball

Billiards 
 Muhammad Lafir

Boxing

Manju Wanniarachchi

Carrom 
 Nishantha Fernando
 Chamil Cooray

Cricket

Cycling
Maurice Coomarawel

Football

Golf
Mithun Perera
Nandasena Perera
Anura Rohana

Gymnastics
 Achini Chamen
Anna-Marie Ondaatje

Karate 
 Wasantha Soysa

Netball
Deepika Abeykoon
Kasturi Chellaraja Wilson
Gayani Dissanayake
Chathurangi Jayasooriya
Nauchalee Rajapakse
Elilenthini Sethukavalar
Tharjini Sivalingam
Dulangi Wannithilake
Mellony Wijesinghe

Racing
Ananda Wedisinghe
Dilantha Malagamuwa

Rugby

Swimming

Mathew Abeysinghe
Cherantha de Silva
Kimiko Raheem
Mayumi Raheem

Table Tennis 
 Dr. Nimal Lucas

Track & field athletes
 
Sriyantha Dissanayake
Manjula Kumara
Himasha Eashan
Sugath Thilakaratne

Weightlifting

Sudesh Peiris
Chinthana Vidanage

See also